Inukjuak is an Inuit reserved land (Category I land for Inuit) in Nunavik, in northern Quebec.  Like all Inuit reserved lands in Quebec, it has no resident population (as of the Canada 2011 Census and previous censuses) and is associated with a nearby northern village of the same name: Inukjuak.

References

Inuit reserved lands in Quebec